Jacob Holm may refer to:
 Jacob Holm (industrialist) (1770–1845), Danish industrialist, ship owner and merchant
 Jacob Holm (handballer) (born 1995), Danish handball player